Tom Healy may refer to:

Tom Healy (poet) (born 1961), American poet
Tom Healy (hurler) (1855–?), Irish sportsperson

See also 
 Thomas Healy (disambiguation)
Tom Healey (1853–1891), American Major League Baseball player